David Hamilton is a Canadian film producer. Hamilton has been nominated on two occasions for the Genie Award for Best Motion Picture (later merged into the Canadian Screen Awards) for the films Bollywood/Hollywood and Water.

Filmography
 Fire (1996)
 Lunch with Charles (2001)
 Bollywood/Hollywood (2002)
 Water (2005)
 Midnight's Children (2012)
 Beeba Boys (2015)
 Anatomy of Violence (2016)
 Funny Boy (2020)

References

External links
 

Canadian film production company founders
Living people
Place of birth missing (living people)
Year of birth missing (living people)